Prawo i pięść ("The Law and the Fist") is a 1964 Polish post-war drama film directed by Jerzy Hoffman and Edward Skórzewski. Based on a 1964 novel of the same name (originally published as Toast) by Józef Hen, the film achieved cult status in the history of Polish cinema.

Synopsis
Set in 1945, immediately after the end of World War II, it tells the story of Andrzej Kenig, a former fighter of the Polish resistance and survivor of a German concentration camp. He is sent with a small group of men as government representatives to the fictional town of Siwowo/Graustadt in the so-called Recovered Territories, the new western territories of Poland. Their task is to secure the property left there by the retreating Germans. The small town is mostly abandoned and the only remaining inhabitants are four women and a drunken waiter at the hotel. Upon reaching the town, Kenig discovers that the other members of the government delegation are not who they claim to be, and that their only task is to loot as much of the property as they can for themselves. Kenig decides to fight against the gang of bandits alone, which leads to a shootout on the rooftops and in the streets of the deserted town.

Background

The motif of a lone hero fighting against a group of villains resulted in the film being described as a "Polish western".

The film is also remembered for its original score, written by Krzysztof Komeda, and especially the popular song Nim wstanie dzień ("before the day breaks"), with music by Komeda, lyrics by Agnieszka Osiecka, and performed by Edmund Fetting.

Cast and characters
 Gustaw Holoubek as Andrzej Kenig
 Zofia Mrozowska as Anna
 Hanna Skarzanka as Barbara Dubikowska
 Wiesław Gołas as Antoni Smólka
 Zdzisław Maklakiewicz as Czesiek Wróbel
 Ryszard Pietruski as Wijas
 Jerzy Przybylski as Doctor Mielecki
 Wiesława Kwaśniewska as Zoska
 Ewa Wiśniewska as Janka
 Zbigniew Dobrzynski as Rudlowski
 Józef Nowak as Lieutenant Wrzesinski
 Adam Perzyk as Maitre d'hotel Schaffer

External links

 

1964 films
1960s Polish-language films
1964 drama films
Polish black-and-white films
Films directed by Jerzy Hoffman
Films scored by Krzysztof Komeda
Films set in 1945